Sabbas (Σάββας pronounced Sávvas) is a Greek masculine given name.

Variant forms or transliterations include Sabas, Savas, Savvas, Saba, Sava, Savva, Savo and Sawa.

Sabbas may refer to, chronologically:

 Sabbas Stratelates (died 272), Roman general, martyr and saint
 Sabbas the Goth (died 372), Christian martyr and saint
 Sabbas the Sanctified (439–532), Cappadocian-Syrian monk, priest and saint
 Saint Sava (1174–1236), Serbian prince, monk, and saint

Greek masculine given names